Sam Givhan is an American politician. A Republican, he is a member of the Alabama State Senate, representing the 7th district since 2018. Previous to his tenure in the Alabama Senate, he was the finance director (2013-2014) and chairman (2014-2018) for the Madison County Republican Party, as well as a lawyer.

References

External links 

 Vote Smart - Sam Givhan profile
 Political profile at Bama Politics

Living people
Republican Party Alabama state senators
21st-century American politicians
Year of birth missing (living people)